The Reham Khan Show was a 2015 Pakistani talk show on Dawn News, that is hosted by British Pakistani journalist Reham Khan. The show made its debut on 24 May 2015. It features a new celebrity every week telecasted every Sunday at 11PM Pakistani Standard Time (PST).

Overview
The format of the show involves personalities from various fields, that have contributed in uplifting Pakistan's image and have become a source of inspiration for the audience, being invited and the story of their life being told.

List of episodes

References

Pakistani television talk shows
2015 Pakistani television series debuts
Dawn Media Group